Table tennis at the 2011 Games of the Small States of Europe will be held from 31 May – 4 June 2011.

Medal summary

Men

Women

Medal table

References
Table tennis Site of the 2011 Games of the Small States of Europe

2011 in table tennis
2011 Games of the Small States of Europe
2011